The Leavenworth State Guard was a militia infantry unit that served in the Union Army during the American Civil War.

History
The Leavenworth State Guard was called into service to defend Kansas against Maj. Gen. Sterling Price's raid on October 9, 1864, and was on duty at Fort Leavenworth. It was disbanded on October 29, 1864.

See also

 List of Kansas Civil War Units
 Kansas in the Civil War

References
 Dyer, Frederick H. A Compendium of the War of the Rebellion (Des Moines, IA: Dyer Pub. Co.), 1908.
Attribution
 

Military units and formations established in 1864
Military units and formations disestablished in 1864
Units and formations of the Union Army from Kansas
Kansas Militia
1864 establishments in Kansas